The  Kwara State House of Assembly is the legislative arm of the government  of  Kwara State of Nigeria. It is a unicameral legislature having 24 members elected from the 16 local government areas of the state.  Local government areas with considerable lager population are delineated into two constituencies to give equal representation. This makes the number of legislators in the Kwara State House of Assembly 24.

The fundamental functions of the Assembly are to enact new laws, amend or repeal existing laws and oversight of the executive. Members of the assembly are elected for a term of four years concurrent with federal legislators (Senate and House of Representatives). The state assembly convenes three times a week (Tuesdays, Wednesdays and Thursdays) in the assembly complex within the state capital, Ilorin.

The current leaders of the 9th Kwara State House of Assembly is Salihu Yakubu-Danladi (Speaker) and Raphael Adetiba (Deputy Speaker).  Magaji Abubakar (House leader) and Bello John Olarenwaju (Deputy). Jummai Halimat Kperogi (Clerk) and Kareem Ahmad Olayiwola (Deputy).

References 

Kwara State
State legislatures of Nigeria